Joseph Wallis may refer to:
 Joseph Wallis (rugby union), British rugby union player
 Joseph A. Wallis, member of the Massachusetts House of Representatives

See also
 Joe Wallis (Harold Joseph Wallis), American baseball player